Working It Out is an American sitcom television series starring Jane Curtin and Stephen Collins that aired on NBC from August 22 to December 12, 1990. The series was created and executive produced by Bill Persky.

Synopsis
Working It Out is the story of two single parents, Sarah Marshall (Jane Curtin) and David Stuart (Stephen Collins), who had never seriously contemplated remarriage until they met each other.  Given their past histories, both had considerable trepidation, and this was reinforced by their friends' attitudes.

Working It Out did not fare well in the Nielsen ratings and was cancelled in December 1990.

Cast
 Jane Curtin as Sarah Marshall
 Stephen Collins as David Stuart
 David Garrison as Stan
 Mary Beth Hurt as Andy
 Kyndra Joy Casper as Molly Marshall
 Chevi Colton as Sophie

Episodes

References

External links
 

1990 American television series debuts
1990 American television series endings
1990s American sitcoms
English-language television shows
NBC original programming
Television series by 20th Century Fox Television
Television shows set in New York City